The ortolan (Emberiza hortulana), also called ortolan bunting, is a Eurasian bird in the bunting family Emberizidae, a passerine family now separated by most modern scholars from the finches, Fringillidae. The genus name Emberiza is from Alemannic German , a bunting. The specific hortulana is from the Italian name for this bird, . The English ortolan is derived from Middle French , "gardener".

The ortolan is served in French cuisine, typically cooked and eaten whole. Traditionally diners cover their heads with their napkin, or a towel, while eating the delicacy.  The bird is so widely used that its French populations dropped dangerously low, leading to laws restricting its use in 1999. In September 2007, the French government announced its intent to enforce long-ignored laws protecting the bird.

Taxonomy
The ortolan bunting was described by the Swedish naturalist Carl Linnaeus in 1758 in the tenth edition of his Systema Naturae and retains its original binomial name of Emberiza hortulana. The species is monotypic. A molecular phylogenetic study of the buntings published in 2008 found that the ortolan bunting is most closely related to Cretzschmar's bunting (Emberiza caesia).

Description

In appearance and habits it much resembles its relative the yellowhammer, but lacks the bright colouring of that species; the ortolan's head, for instance, is greenish-grey, instead of a bright yellow. The song of the male ortolan resembles that of the yellowhammer.

Distribution and habitat
A native of most European countries and western Asia,  it reaches as far north as Scandinavia and beyond the Arctic Circle, frequenting cornfields and their neighbourhoods. It is an uncommon vagrant in spring, and particularly autumn, to the British Isles.

It was spotted at Kenjar Coastal Karnataka, India, in November 2018 and photographed by Birdwatchers. Some birders commented that it is the first photographic record of an ortolan bunting in India.

Behaviour
Ortolan nests are placed on or near the ground.

The maximum age recorded is six years and ten months for a bird found dead in Switzerland.

Seeds are the natural diet, but beetles and other insects are taken when feeding their young.

As food 

The birds are caught with nets set during their autumn migratory flight to Africa. They are then kept in covered cages or boxes. The birds react to the dark by gorging themselves on grain, usually millet seed, until they double their bulk. The birds are then thrown into a container of Armagnac, which both drowns and marinates the birds.

The bird is roasted for eight minutes and then plucked.  The consumer then places the bird feet first into their mouth while holding onto the bird's head.  The ortolan is then eaten whole, with or without the head, and the consumer spits out the larger bones.  The traditional way French gourmands eat ortolans is to cover their heads and face with a large napkin or towel while consuming the bird.  The purpose of the towel is debated.  Some claim it is to retain the maximum aroma with the flavour as they consume the entire bird at once, others have stated "Tradition dictates that this is to shield – from God’s eyes – the shame of such a decadent and disgraceful act", and others have suggested the towel simply hides the consumers spitting out bones.  This use of the towel was begun by a priest, a friend of Jean Anthelme Brillat-Savarin.

At one time, the island of Cyprus formed a chief depot for the export of ortolans, which were pickled in spices and vinegar and packed in casks containing from 300 to 400 each. In the early 20th century, between 400 and 500 casks were annually exported from Cyprus.

Noted meals
The Three Emperors Dinner in 1867 included ortolans on toast among its 16 courses. 
 In the 1958 film Gigi, the title character learns to eat them in her eloquence lessons. 
The favourite dish of medicine Nobel laureate and inventor of the lobotomy procedure, António Egas Moniz, was ortolans as prepared at the restaurant Le Chapon Fin in Bordeaux.
In 1975, food critic Craig Claiborne made a winning $300 bid in an auction for a dinner for two, courtesy of American Express, at any restaurant in the world that takes its credit card. Claiborne selected Chez Denis in Paris for a $4,000 meal ($20,665 in 2022) that included a course of ortolans.
In 1995, former French President François Mitterrand's last New Year's Eve meal included this specially prepared bird.
In The Grand Tour special "Carnage A Trois", James May is shown at a restaurant with a napkin draped over his head, a reference to the method of eating an ortolan.

In Season 1 Episode 6 of Succession, two characters are shown to eat Ortolan with towels on their heads at a fine-dining restaurant in New York City.

Legal status
Ortolan hunting was banned in France in 1999, but the law was poorly enforced and it is thought that up to 50,000 ortolans were illegally killed each year during the autumn migration: mostly birds from breeding grounds in Finland and the Baltic area. According to France's League for the Protection of Birds, France's ortolan population fell 30% between 1997 and 2007. In 2007, the French government vowed to strictly enforce some existing rules about banning the practice, with the maximum fine set at €6,000 (£4,800 or $6,728). Killing and cooking ortolans is banned across the EU. In 2007, the pressure from France's League for Protection of Birds and from the European Union resulted in the French government promising to enforce the EU directive protecting the ortolan. After several years of active citizen watch revealing little if any change in the field situation, the local representative of the government repeated this statement in 2016.

European Union member states prohibit:
 deliberate killing or capture of these birds by any method; 
 deliberate destruction of, or damage to, their nests and eggs or removal of their nests; 
 taking their eggs in the wild and keeping these eggs; 
 deliberate disturbance of these birds particularly during the period of breeding and rearing, insofar as this would have a significant negative effect on the birds; 
 keeping birds, the hunting and capture of which is prohibited; 
 sale, transport for sale, keeping for sale and the offering for sale of live or dead birds and of any readily recognizable parts or derivatives of these birds.

As of 2018, the overall Ortolan bunting's population is listed by the IUCN as Least Concern (LC).

See also
 Ambelopoulia
 Animal rights
 Animal welfare
 Cruelty to animals

References

Citations

Bibliography

Further reading

External links

 
 
 Ortolan Bunting (Emberiza hortulana) from the website of the European Commission
 Xeno-canto: sound recordings of the ortolan bunting
 343: Poultry Slam 2007, a November 2007 episode of This American Life with a segment about eating ortolan
 Oiseaux Photographs, text, map; 
 Ageing and sexing (PDF; 1.6 MB) by Javier Blasco-Zumeta and Gerd-Michael Heinze

ortolan bunting
Animal welfare
Birds of Europe
Birds of Central Asia
Birds of Africa
Ceremonial food and drink
French cuisine
Force-feeding
ortolan bunting
ortolan bunting